34th & 8th is a live album by O.A.R. released on July 27, 2004.  The double-CD set and DVD were released on Everfine Records.  The album's title comes from the intersection of New York City's historic Hammerstein Ballroom, where the album was recorded on November 28–29, 2003.  The album debuted on the Billboard Charts Top Independent: #6 and on the Billboard 200: #80.

Track listing

DVD Tracks
1. Dareh Meyod

2. About Mr. Brown

3. Old Man Time

4. City On Down...Delicate Few

5. Right On Time

6. I Feel Home

7. That Was A Crazy Game Of Poker

O.A.R. albums
2004 live albums
Albums recorded at the Hammerstein Ballroom